Michelsonia is a genus of tree in the legume family, Fabaceae, where it is classified in the subfamily Detarioideae. It is a monotypic genus, the only species being Michelsonia microphylla. It is native to the tropical rain forests of the Democratic Republic of the Congo. The wood is used locally for construction work.

Description
The trunk is cylindrical and bare of branches for the first . The pinnate leaves are alternate and have ten to sixteen pairs of leaflets. These are so heavy that they sink in water. This tree is similar in appearance to Tetraberlinia baregarum, with which it can be confused.

Ecology
This tree is one of several species in the family Fabaceae that form monodominant stands in the rainforests of the Democratic Republic of the Congo, either singly, or in conjunction with Brachystegia laurentii, Cynometra alexandri, Gilbertiodendron dewevrei or Julbernardia seretii. In 1983, it occurred throughout the Congo Basin. However it has become much rarer and is no longer plentiful in its previous habitats.

References

Detarioideae
Monotypic Fabaceae genera
Trees of Africa